The Clark Mountains are a group of low mountains rising above  located in the Ford Ranges, Marie Byrd Land, Antarctica. They were discovered and photographed on aerial flights in 1940 by the US Antarctic Service and named for Clark University in Worcester, Massachusetts.

Features 

 Kelly Nunataks
 Mesquite Valley
 Mount Atwood
 Mount Burnham
 Mount Ekblaw
 Mount Jones
 Mount Maglione
 Mount Van Valkenburg

Further reading 
 Sugden, David. (2003).Holocene Deglaciation of Marie Byrd Land, West Antarctica
 C.J. ADAMS, D. SEWARD and S.D. WEAVER, Geochronology of Cretaceous granites and metasedimentary basement on Edward VII Peninsula, Marie Byrd Land, West Antarctica, Antarctic Science 7 (3): 265-277 (1995)
  C.J. Adams (1987), Geochronology of granite terranes in the Ford Ranges, Marie Byrd Land, West Antarctica,  New Zealand Journal of Geology and Geophysics, 30:1, 51–72, DOI: 10.1080/00288306.1987.10422193
 GEORGE A DOUMANI; ERNEST G EHLERS, Petrography of Rocks from Mountains in Marie Byrd Land, West Antarctica, GSA Bulletin (1962) 73 (7): 877–882. https://doi.org/10.1130/0016-7606(1962)73[877:PORFMI]2.0.CO;2 
 International Symposium on Antarctic Earth Sciences 5th : 1987, Geological Evolution of Antarctica, Cambridge, England

External links 

 [https://geonames.usgs.gov/apex/f?p=gnispq:5:::NO::P5_ANTAR_ID:2834 Clark Mountains
 [https://data.aad.gov.au/aadc/gaz/display_name.cfm?gaz_id=123589 Clark Mountains
 [https://data.aad.gov.au/aadc/gaz/scar/search_names_action.cfm?search_text=2719&feature_type_code=0&country_id=0&relic_options=include_relics&north=-45.0&south=-90.0&west=-180.0&east=180.0&search_near=&radius=0.5&gazetteers=SCAR Clark Mountains

References 
 

Ford Ranges